Shonar Pahar is a 2018 Indian Bengali drama film directed by Parambrata Chattopadhyay. The film portrays the journey and friendship between two people, a 7-year old young orphan and a 70-year old grandmother.

Plot 
The film opens in an old dilapidated home in the suburbs of Kolkata, with Upama, a 72-year old retired school teacher residing alone. She is estranged from her only son, Soumya, who lives separately with his wife, Moumita. Upama is shown to be bitter and reminisces the time spent with Soumya. The owner of a local NGO, played by Parambrata Chattopadhyay, introduces her to 7-year old orphan boy named Bitlu, and a bond begins to form between them. One day, Upama and Bitlu go missing and thus ensues an emotional journey for Soumya to find his mother and mend the distance between them.

Cast 

 Tanuja as Upama Mukherjee
 Jisshu Sengupta as Shoumya Mukherjee
 Soumitra Chatterjee as Rajat
 Parambrata Chattopadhyay as Rajdeep the owner of Anandaghar, an NGO
 Swarnava Sanyal as Child Soumo
 Srijato Bandhopadhyay as Bitlu
 Arunima Ghosh as Moumita, Soumya's wife

 Lama Haldar as a cab driver

References

External links
 

Indian drama films
Bengali-language Indian films
2010s Bengali-language films